This is a list of events relating to Italian television in 1994.

Events

RAI 

 20 March: the TG3 reporter Ilaria Alpi and the cameramen Miran Hrovatin were killed in an ambush in Mogadiscio, while they were covering the operation Restore Hope. Those responsible for the killing have yet to be identified. The killing is widely believed to have been due to Alpi's enquiries about the arms trade and toxic waste traffic.

Fininvest 
14 December - Debut of Re per una notte, a series hosted by Gigi Sabani in which members of the public impersonated their favourite singers.

Debuts

RAI

Variety 

 Carramba che sorpresa! – with Raffaella Carrà; 8 seasons. An Italian version of the British Surprise, surprise, Carramba che sorpresa! is a mix of variety and reality show, with ordinary people who are surprised by meetings with lost relatives or their favorite celebrities. The success of the show has led to the coinage of the Italian word “carrambata”, meaning an unexpected encounter.

News and educational 
Misteri (Mysteries) – program about paranormal events and pseudoscience, hosted by Lorenza Foschini; 5 seasons.

Finivenst

Variety 
14 December - Re per una notte (1994-1996)
Stranamore (Strangelove) – reality show, hosted by Alberto Castagna and Emanuela Foliero, Italian version of the Dutch All you need is love; 14 seasons. The host tours Italy in a camper, carrying love video-messages and trying to reconcile couples in crisis; the show, ravaged by critics for its blatant sentimentality, gets the same an extraordinary public success.

International
6 March -  Renegade (Italia 1) (1992-1997)
14 August -  Adventures of Sonic the Hedgehog (Italia 1) (1993)
 The Dreamstone (Rai 1) (1990-1995)
 X-Men (Canale 5) (1992-1997)
 Bananas in Pyjamas (Rai 2) (1992-2001, 2011-2013)
 Biker Mice From Mars (Rai 1) (1994-1996)
 Sonic the Hedgehog (Italia 1) (1993-1994)

Television shows

RAI

Drama 
 A che punto è la notte (How deep the night is) – by Nanni Loy, a detective story in two episodes from the novel by Fruttero & Lucentini. Marcello Mastroianni resumes the role of the superintendent Santamaria, who he previously played in The Sunday woman.

Three chapters of the LUX Vide's Bible project were aired, all with music by Ennio Morricone:

 Genesis: The creation and the flood – by Ermanno Olmi, with Omero Antonutti as Noah.
 Jacob - by Peter Hall, with Matthew Modine.
 Joseph – by Roger Young, with Paul Mercurio and Ben Kingsley (Potifar)

Miniseries 
Benito – by Gianluigi Calderone, with Antonio Banderas in the title role, Claudia Koll (Rachele Mussolini) and Luca Zingaretti (Pietro Nenni); script by Vincenzo Cerami and Lidia Ravera; 3 episodes.
Italian restaurant – romantic comedy by Giorgio Capitani, with Gigi Proietti as the owner of an Italian restaurant in New York, Nancy Brilli and Cristiana Capotondi; 8 episodes.
Soccer fever – by Marco Pagot and Hitoshi Oda, Italian-Japanese cartoon about the history of the FIFA world cup, released in honour of the 1994 FIFA World Cup.

Variety 

 L’approfondimento in casa Gnocchi (The deepening to Gnocchi's) – satirical show; Gene Gnocchi (at his RAI debut) and his dazed family comment on the events of the week. 
Papaveri e papere (Poppies and ducks) – show about the history of the Sanremo Music Festival, by Michele Guardì, hosted by Pippo Baudo and Giancarlo Magalli; it was the final public performance of Mia Martini.

News and educational 
La lunga marcia (The long march) – by Enzo Biagi, in 6 episodes; reportage about China.
Eppur si muove (And yet it moves) – talk show about the Italian custom, ideated and hosted by Indro Montanelli and Beniamino Placido.
Pickwick, del leggere e dello scrivere (PIckwick, about reading and writing) – magazine about books and literature, hosted by Alessandro Baricco and Giovanna Zucconi.

Mediaset

Drama 
Fantaghirò 4 – by Lamberto Bava, with Alessandra Martines,  Horst Bucholz and Brigitte Nielsen.

Ending this year

Births

Deaths

See also
List of Italian films of 1994

References